Colonel Edgar Thomas Inkson  (5 April 1872 – 19 February 1947) was a recipient of the Victoria Cross, the highest and most prestigious award for gallantry in the face of the enemy that can be awarded to British and Commonwealth forces.

Victoria Cross
Inkson was 27 years old, and a lieutenant in the Royal Army Medical Corps, British Army, attached to The Royal Inniskilling Fusiliers during the Second Boer War when the following deed took place on 24 February 1900, at Hart's Hill, Colenso, South Africa for which he was awarded the VC:

He was promoted to Captain while still serving in South Africa. Captain Inkson personally received the decoration by King Edward VII during an investiture at Buckingham Palace on 12 May 1902.

His Victoria Cross is displayed at the Army Medical Services Museum, Mytchett, England.

Inkson is buried in Brookwood Cemetery.

Later career
He later achieved the rank of colonel after serving in the First World War.

References

Monuments to Courage (David Harvey, 1999)
The Register of the Victoria Cross (This England, 1997)
Victoria Crosses of the Anglo-Boer War (Ian Uys, 2000)

External links
Location of grave and VC medal (Woking Crematorium)
Colonel E.T. Inkson
The Brookwood Cemetery Society (Known Holders of the Victoria Cross Commemorated in Brookwood Cemetery)
Angloboerwar.com

Second Boer War recipients of the Victoria Cross
Royal Army Medical Corps officers
Companions of the Distinguished Service Order
1872 births
1947 deaths
British Army personnel of the Second Boer War
British Army personnel of World War I
Burials at Brookwood Cemetery
People from Nainital
British Army recipients of the Victoria Cross